Person to Bunny is a 1960 Merrie Melodies animated cartoon directed by Friz Freleng. The short was released on April 1, 1960, and stars Bugs Bunny, Daffy Duck and Elmer Fudd.

Plot
In his Hollywood home, Bugs Bunny is being interviewed on the TV show People to People with Cedric R. Burrows (a spoof of the Edward R. Murrow series, Person to Person). As Bugs is interviewed, Daffy Duck shows up. Seeing that Bugs is being interviewed, Daffy plans to get in on the action, but Bugs doesn't want any interference and puts Daffy out.

Burrows then asks how Bugs has outsmarted Elmer Fudd over the years and Bugs answers that Fudd is far from clever and notoriously stupid. Elmer is watching the program at home and upon hearing Bugs' remarks about him ("his I.Q. is P.U.!"), he gets furious and plans to come to the interview. Elmer comes over and Bugs stops the interview to settle with Elmer while Daffy sings a Ted Lewis song to Mr. Burrows. Elmer gives Bugs a chance to apologize for calling him stupid or get shot, but it backfires when Bugs puts a carrot in the gun. Elmer puts his rifle through a crack in the door and Bugs tricks Daffy into thinking it is a TV camera. Elmer shoots Daffy, leaving him with a bent beak and feathers missing. Daffy is now jealous of Bugs and thinking that being a rabbit was all Bugs did to be famous, starts mocking Bugs with a rabbit suit eating a carrot and says that anyone can do what he does. Then Elmer comes back and starts shooting and chasing Daffy, thinking that he is Bugs. Daffy points to Bugs and Elmer chases Bugs outside. In Bugs' absence, Daffy decides to do a song and dance number for Mr. Burrows, donning a pair of gloves, a hat and a bow tie.

Outside, Bugs outsmarts Elmer by spinning him around in a log near a cliff so Elmer always comes out the cliff end of the log. Elmer gets confused and stays in the log panting while Bugs goes back to his interview. Back home, Bugs decides to get rid of Daffy by letting him be on TV. Bugs mentions to Daffy that there will be 40 million people watching the show. When Daffy hears this, he gets stage fright and faints. Bugs fans Daffy and tells Burrows, "Good night, Mr. Burrows" and Mr. Burrows tells Bugs "Good night, Bugs".

Cast
Mel Blanc as Bugs Bunny and Daffy Duck
Arthur Q. Bryan as Elmer Fudd (Archive)
Daws Butler as Cedric R. Burrows (uncredited)

Home media
"Person to Bunny" is available on the Looney Tunes Superstars DVD. However, it was cropped to widescreen. It was also included in the Stars of Space Jam: Daffy Duck DVD, this time in the ratio in which it was originally animated (fullscreen aspect ratio). In 2020 the cartoon was released on Blu-Ray as part of the Bugs Bunny 80th Anniversary Collection once again in its correct aspect ratio.

References

External links

 

1960 films
1960 short films
1960 comedy films
1960 animated films
1960s English-language films
1960s Warner Bros. animated short films
Merrie Melodies short films
Bugs Bunny films
Daffy Duck films
Elmer Fudd films
Animated films set in Los Angeles
Short films directed by Friz Freleng
Films with screenplays by Michael Maltese
Films scored by Milt Franklyn
Warner Bros. Cartoons animated short films